Janak Trivedi was a Gujarati short story writer, essayist and novelist. He was born on 10 June 1946 in Kothi, a village near Jasdan, Rajkot district, Gujarat, India. He was a station manager in Indian Railways at Bhavnagar division. He was also a good painter.

He published his short story collection Baval Vavnar Ane Biji Vartao in 1995. Nathi is a novel written by him. Maro Asabaab (2008) is his collections of Essays. His short stories are characterised by  non-urban Gujarat's life style as well as its culture, language and dialects.

He received several prizes from Gujarati Sahitya Parishad and Gujarat Sahitya Academy for his books. He is also a recipient of Sandhan Award And Mudra Chandrak. He died on 29 January 2007 at Guwahati following heart attack.

See also
 List of Gujarati-language writers

References

External links
 
 

1946 births
2007 deaths
People from Rajkot district
Gujarati-language writers
Indian male novelists
Indian male short story writers
Novelists from Gujarat
21st-century Indian short story writers
21st-century Indian novelists
21st-century Indian male writers